Sunday Supplement (formerly Jimmy Hill's Sunday Supplement) is a Sunday morning television programme in the United Kingdom about football which was broadcast between 1999 and 2020. The programme aired on Sunday mornings on Sky Sports Premier League and Sky Sports Football, during the football season. The length of the show is 90 minutes, including commercials, although it was occasionally cut down to 60 minutes.

History
Launched under the stewardship of Jimmy Hill, three guest football journalists sit around a table over breakfast/brunch and discuss the latest football matches, news and gossip, including a look at the football stories in the Sunday newspapers.

The proposal was that it was set in Hill's actual kitchen, with fans trying to guess where his home was from the window view. But the truth came to light on several occasions in 2006 when Hill was late claiming to be stuck in traffic.

The programme is the successor to the Friday night discussion show Hold the Back Page, which is still occasionally broadcast in its usual slot.

Revamp
In 2007, Sky Sports decided not to renew Hill's 12 month contract, which coincided with the removal of his name from the title.

The presenter role was given to either Bill Bradshaw and Brian Woolnough. The format and setting remained consistent set over a breakfast/brunch table, but guest football journalists increased from two to three. Woolnough later took on the permanent presenter role, with regular guests including Patrick Barclay, Oliver Holt, Martin Samuel, Paul Smith and Henry Winter. Since Woolnough's death in September 2012, Neil Ashton went on to host the programme after having initially stood in during his predecessor's illness. On 12 January 2020, Ashton presented the show for the final time. Jacqui Oatley was announced as the new presenter of the show on 14 January 2020.

Beginning in 2009, a podcast of the show was made available on the Sky Sports website and iTunes.

In August 2020, Sky announced the show had been cancelled for the 2020/21 season, blaming the congested fixture schedule. A podcast continues, hosted by Vicky Gomersall and Darren Lewis.

References

External links
Sunday Supplement website

1999 British television series debuts
2020 British television series endings
1990s British sports television series
2000s British sports television series
2010s British sports television series
2020s British sports television series
Sky UK original programming
English-language television shows
Sky Sports
Premier League on television